The 1983 Custom Credit Australian Indoor Championships was a men's tennis tournament played on indoor hard courts at the Sydney Entertainment Centre in Sydney in Australia and was part of the 1983 Volvo Grand Prix. It was the 11th edition of the tournament and was held from 10 October through 16 October 1983. Defending champion and top-seeded John McEnroe won his fourth successive singles title.

Finals

Singles

 John McEnroe defeated  Henri Leconte 6–1, 6–4, 7–5
 It was McEnroe's 5th singles title of the year and the 44th of his career.

Doubles

 Mark Edmondson /  Sherwood Stewart defeated  John McEnroe /  Peter Rennert 6–2, 6–4
 It was Edmondson's 3rd title of the year and the 31st of his career. It was Stewart's 4th title of the year and the 46th of his career.

References

External links
 ITF – tournament edition details

 
Custom Credit Australian Indoor Championships
Australian Indoor Tennis Championships
In
Custom Credit Australian Indoor Championships
Sports competitions in Sydney
Tennis in New South Wales